is a real-time strategy video game developed by Genki. It was published in Japan by Electronic Arts on February 21, 2008, in North America by Xseed Games on November 10, 2008, and in Europe by Rising Star Games on February 27, 2009, for the Nintendo DS.

Reception

References

External links
 Populous DS  official website 
 Populous DS official website 

2008 video games
Electronic Arts games
Genki (company) games
Nintendo DS games
Nintendo DS-only games
Populous (series)
Real-time strategy video games
Video games developed in Japan
Video games with isometric graphics
Rising Star Games games
Multiplayer and single-player video games
Xseed Games games